Luis García San Miguel (1929–2006) was a Spanish academic and jurist.

1929 births
2006 deaths
20th-century Spanish philosophers
People from Asturias
People from Oviedo
Philosophers of law
Spanish academics
Spanish jurists